Carissa Kainani Moore (born August 27, 1992) is a Hawaiian American Olympian, world champion surfer and activist. She was the first-ever winner of the Olympic Gold Medal in women's short board surfing in 2020. She was also the 2011, 2013, 2015, 2019 and 2021 World Surf League WSL Women's World Tour Champion. Moore is the first surfer in history to win a WSL world title and the Olympic title in the same year.

In 2013, she was named by Glamour magazine as one of their Women of the Year. She became a member of the Surfers' Hall of Fame in 2014. In 2022, Moore was featured in Naomi Hirahara's anthology We Are Here: 30 Inspiring Asian Americans and Pacific Islanders Who Have Shaped the United States that was published by the Smithsonian Institution and Running Press Kids.

Early life 
When she was five years old, Moore started surfing with her dad off the beaches of Waikiki in Honolulu, Hawaii. "Dad taught me how to surf when I was about four or five years old at Waikiki Beach and I was immediately hooked." Her father, Chris, was a competitive open water swimmer who won a number of competitions. He lived closer to the water than Moore's landlocked mother, so Moore chose Hawaii, the ocean, and her father after her parents divorced when she was ten years old. When Moore stayed with her mother and her motivation for surfing would start to wane she would write letters to her father to stay motivated.

She started earning multiple wins at National Scholastic Surfing Association, NSSA, junior surf competitions at age 11. She also won top spots at the International Surfing Association, ISA, World Junior Surfing Championships, where she helped Hawaii win a team victory. In all, she clinched a record 11 NSSA amateur titles, and at age 16 in 2008, she became the youngest champion at a Triple Crown of Surfing event when she won the Reef Hawaiian Pro.

Career 
In 2010, Moore qualified to compete on the ASP (now called the World Surf League) Championship Tour. She won two major contests, finished third overall, and was named Rookie of the Year.

The following season, Moore was a youngster to watch on the World Tour and she lived up to her reputation, winning three events and claiming her first World crown, unseating four-time defending champ Stephanie Gilmore in the process. At 18, she became the youngest person – male or female – to win a surfing world title.

Moore took top World Tour honors again in 2013 and 2015.

Moore has been named an Adventurer of the Year by National Geographic, a Woman of the Year by Glamour magazine and Top Female Surfer in the SURFER magazine poll (numerous times). She was inducted into the Surfers' Hall of Fame, and the State of Hawaii declared January 4 to be Carissa Moore Day.

2019 Championship Tour
At the 2019 World Surf League Women's Championship Tour, Moore finished in first place and qualified for the 2020 Summer Olympics.

2020
She announced after the 2019 season that she would take a break from the world tour in 2020.

2020 Summer Olympics 

Moore qualified to compete for the United States in surfing on the U.S. women's team with Caroline Marks at the 2020 Summer Olympics held in Tokyo, Japan and postponed to 2021 due to the COVID-19 pandemic. Moore competed under the flag of the United States for the first time in her career at the 2020 Summer Olympics as the World Surf League and International Surfing Association both recognize Hawaii as an entity separate of the United States. At the 2020 Olympic Games, she represented the United States for the first time and was the first surfer to participate in the Olympic Games that is ethnically Hawaiian since the final Olympic appearance of Duke Kahanamoku in  1924.

In the first round of competition, Moore scored an 11.74 and won her heat, which advanced her directly to the third round of competition. Moore won her heat of the third round of competition against Peruvian Sofía Mulánovich with a 10.34 and advanced to the quarterfinals. Moore won her head-to-head competition with a score of 14.26 in the quarterfinals against Brazilian Silvana Lima and advanced to the semifinals. In the semifinals match between Moore and Japan's Amuro Tsuzuki, Moore won and advanced to the final heat where surfers compete for the gold and silver medals. In the final match against South African Bianca Buitendag, Moore won the Olympic gold medal with a score of 14.93. As the 2020 Summer Olympics were the first Olympic Games where surfing was included as a sport, Moore became the first woman in history to win an Olympic gold medal in surfing.

2021 Season 

In 2021, Carissa Moore won the WSL season at the WSL Finals in Trestles (surfing). She also won the Triple Crown of Surfing in January 2022.

Personal 
Moore is of Irish and German descent through her father, while her mother is Native Hawaiian and Filipino. She chooses to wear the flag of Hawaii, which is similar to the Hawaii State flag, instead of the United States flag when she competes for the United States at World Surf League international competitions.

Surfer and shark attack survivor Bethany Hamilton wrote in her autobiography that she admired Moore's toughness when they participated in the same competition as seven to nine year olds.

Moore is a 2010 graduate from Punahou School in Honolulu. She married her high school sweetheart, Luke Untermann, on December 16, 2017.

In 2018, Moore launched Moore Aloha Charitable Foundation, a 501(c)(3) organization focused on using surfing as a platform to bring young women together.

WSL Qualifying Series 
In 2008, at the age of 16, Moore became the youngest winner of a Triple Crown of Surfing event when she won the Reef Hawaiian Pro, a 6-Star WQS Prime Event.

In 2009, Moore qualified for the 2010 ASP World Tour from the ASP Women's WQS.

In 2010, Moore won the US Open of Surfing, a 6-Star WQS Prime Event.

In 2011, Moore received a wildcard entry into the Men's Triple Crown of Surfing, limited to the Reef Hawaiian Pro at Haleiwa and the Vans Hawaiian Pro at Sunset Beach, becoming the first woman in history to be given the honor.

WSL Women’s Championship Tour
In 2007, Moore reached the Final of the ASP Women's World Tour Roxy Pro event as a wildcard, becoming the youngest surfer to reach a Final of an ASP World Title Race event. The Roxy Pro wildcard entry was the first Women's World Tour event Moore entered after success in the Roxy Pro Trials.

In 2009, Moore won the ASP Women's World Tour Gidget Pro Sunset Beach event as a wildcard entrant.

In 2010, Moore started competing on the ASP Women's World Tour. During her first year on the Tour Moore won both the TSB Bank Women's Surf Festival and Rip Curl Pro Portugal. Moore's 2010 Women's World Tour Ranking was 3rd overall. and she was awarded the ASP Women's World Tour Rookie of the Year.

In 2011, Moore was declared the ASP Women's World Champion, the youngest winner of the Title. Throughout the 2011 Tour, Moore won the Billabong Rio Pro, Commonwealth Bank Beachley Classic and the Roxy Pro Gold Coast.

In 2012, Moore finished 3rd in the 2012 ASP World Tour, failing to win any ASP World Tour events, coming runner-up in two events.

In 2013, Moore won four of the eight ASP World Tour events and became World Champion for the second time in her career.

In 2014, Moore won three WSL Women's Championship Tour events.

In 2015, she again won four Events of the WSL Championship Tour and won her third world title.

In 2016, Moore's only victory was the Roxy Pro in Hossegor, France.

In 2017, she finished the year at No. 5.

In 2018, she finished the year at No. 3.

In 2019, she won her fourth world championship, winning stops in France and South Africa.

In 2021, she won another world championship, successfully defending her title against Tatiana Weston-Webb in a head-to-head title match at the inaugural WSL Finals.

WSL Event Wins

National Scholastic Surfing Association Titles
Moore is known for her unprecedented 11 National Scholastic Surfing Association (NSSA) Titles.

International Surfing Association

2005, Moore represented Hawai‘i at the International Surfing Association (ISA) World Junior Surfing Championships and was placed 3rd in the Female Junior Final (under 18) category. Moore aided Hawai‘i's first team victory in a World Junior surfing contest.

Notes
1 & 2   The equivalent of an ASP Women’s Star; at the time it was known as an ASP 6-Star Prime within the Women’s World Qualifying Series (WQS).
3  As a wildcard entrant Moore was ineligible to compete in the ASP World Title Race.

See also
 Association of Surfing Professionals
 Chinese-Hawaiians
 National Scholastic Surfing Association
 Punahou School Alumni

References

External links
Carissa Moore Official website
World Surf League profile

1992 births
Living people
American surfers
American female surfers
Native Hawaiian people
Native Hawaiian surfers
World Surf League surfers
Sportspeople from Honolulu
Olympic surfers of the United States
Surfers at the 2020 Summer Olympics
Olympic gold medalists for the United States in surfing
Medalists at the 2020 Summer Olympics
21st-century American women
Punahou School alumni